Louisette Fleuret (29 April 1919 – 3 December 1965) was a French swimmer. She competed in the women's 400 metre freestyle at the 1936 Summer Olympics.

References

External links
 

1919 births
1965 deaths
Olympic swimmers of France
Swimmers at the 1936 Summer Olympics
Swimmers from Paris
French female freestyle swimmers
20th-century French women